Eupithecia seminigra is a moth in the family Geometridae. It is found in Peru.

References

Moths described in 1904
seminigra
Moths of South America